"Every Night" is a song recorded by South Korean girl group EXID. The song was released as a digital single on October 2, 2012 through AB Entertainment. The song is written by member LE, and co-produced by LE and Shinsadong Tiger. "Every Night" is a rearrangement of the track "Call", which was on their first extended play, Hippity Hop.

Music video
The music video for "Every Night" was released on October 4, 2012. In the music video the members of EXID prepare a bright red concoction which is made out of an unknown substance. They then put the red liquid into glass test tubes, and then pack them in a padded briefcase. The video then cuts to a party, where there is a man dressed in a suit, with many beautiful ladies wearing white dresses. When the members of EXID arrive, the man and the women laugh and toast to the man. The members of EXID then proceed to remove the test tubes out of the briefcase and then throw them on the floor, which releases the red liquid inside. The substance causes all the women to start sneezing and regurgitating the champagne onto the man, and they fall unconscious to the ground while the members of EXID dance around the dead bodies while wearing gas masks. The video then rewinds back to the start, and reveals the red liquid was created using deadly red chillis.

Promotions
EXID had their comeback stage on Music Bank on October 12, 2012. The group also performed “Every Night” on various live television music shows such as M Countdown, Show! Music Core and Inkigayo in October and November 2012. EXID also performed the song on various international television appearances. In Music Bank's K-Chart "Every Night" debuted and ranked at number 40, but dropped to number 50 the next week, the last week in the K-Chart.

Chart performance
"Every Night" entered the Gaon Singles Chart at number 43 during the week of September 30, 2012. By the end of October "Every Night" peaked at number 100 on the Gaon Monthly Single Chart, and had sold 162,096 downloads.

Track listing

Credits and personnel 
Shinsadong Tiger – executive producer co-producing
Heo Sol-ji - vocals
Ahn Hee-yeon - vocals
Seo Hye-lin - vocals
Ahn Hyo-jin - vocals, rap, writing, co-producing
Park Jung-hwa - vocals

Charts

Release history

References

External links
 

2012 singles
Korean-language songs
Songs written by Shinsadong Tiger
Song recordings produced by Shinsadong Tiger
EXID songs
2012 songs